The Emigrants is a novel by Vilhelm Moberg from 1949. It is the first part of The Emigrants series.

Plot 
The story takes place in the 1840s up to 1850. The first part of the novel describes the hardships faced by rural families in Sweden. Karl Oskar Nilsson and his wife, Kristina, own a farm in Ljuder socken in Småland. They have four children and work hard to make a living, but the poor harvests lead to famine, a catalyst for the beginnings of emigration to the United States in search of a better life. Karl Oskar and his brother Robert want to go, but Kristina doesn't want to leave her home country, knowing that she will never see the rest of their family again. But after the death of their oldest child, she accepts her husband's plans when she realizes that they are in just as much danger from their lives in Sweden as on the big sea and in a New World.

They pack up all their belongings and book passage in a group with others from their parish. The characters illustrate some of the motives that prompted people to leave Sweden in the 19th century. The travelers include:

 Karl-Oskar, Kristina and their children – seeking to escape poverty and famine and finding a place where their work pays off.
 Robert, Karl Oskar's adventurous brother – landless, as the second son of a farmer whose holdings are too small to sub-divide. He seeks escape from the harsh conditions of being a hired farmhand.
 Danjel Andreasson with family, Kristina's maternal uncle, who has been banished from the country due to his religious "delusions." The state Lutheran church was very powerful, and dissent, even in the simple form of home Bible study, is not tolerated. They bring their farmhand Arvid, who is a friend of Robert.
 Jonas Petter Albrektsson, who seeks to escape from an unhappy marriage at a time when divorce was not possible.
 Ulrika of Västergöhl, a former prostitute, looking to leave her past behind and start afresh with her daughter Elin.

The second part of the book tells how they board the ship in Karlshamn, and then how the life goes on during the ten weeks they spend on board – battling sea-sickness and scurvy, travelling across the Atlantic Ocean before finally reaching New York City in midsummer of 1850. The novel ends with the travellers marvelling at the technological wonders of their new home, emblematised in the almost-complete Hudson River Railroad (which would grow into the New York Central) finally opened October 3, 1851.

1949 Swedish novels
Novels by Vilhelm Moberg
Swedish historical novels
Novels set in the 1840s
Novels set in Sweden
Fictional works set in the Atlantic Ocean
Novels set in the 1850s
Novels set in the Atlantic Ocean
Swedish-language novels
Novels set in Småland
Works about Swedish-American culture